The financial result is the difference between earnings before interest and taxes and earnings before taxes. It is determined by the earning or the loss which results from financial affairs.

Interpretation 
For most industrial companies the financial result is negative, as the interest charged on borrowing generally exceeds income from investments (dividends). If a company records a positive financial Result over several periods, then one has to ask how much capital is invested at which interest rate, and if this capital would not bear a greater yield if it were invested in the company's growth. In case of constant, positive financial results a company also has to deal with increasing demands for special distributions to its shareholders.

Calculation formula 
In mathematical terms financial result is defined as follows:

Advantages 
The advantages of the use of financial result as a key performance indicator

 The financial result provides information about financing costs.
 Information may be gained about non-consolidated companies.

Disadvantages 
The disadvantages of the use of financial result as a Key performance indicator

 Operating components may be included in the financial result (e.g.: the income from financing activities).
 Investment income as a component of the financial result does not provide any information on the risk inherent in this investment.
 The financial result may vary strongly over time.

References 
 Wiehle, Ulrich, Henryk Deter, Michael Rolf, Michael Diegelmann, Peter Noel Schomig. 100 IFRS Financial Ratios (Cometis AG), 2005, 

Profit
Financial ratios